Pat Walker (born 24 March 1986) is a former professional rugby league footballer who plays as a  or  for Hunslet RLFC in the RFL League 1.

He played for the Dewsbury Rams in Championship 1 and the Championship, and the Sheffield Eagles in two separate spells and the Batley Bulldogs in the Championship.

References

External links
Sheffield Eagles profile

1986 births
Living people
Hunslet R.L.F.C. players
Rugby league locks
Rugby league five-eighths
Batley Bulldogs players
Dewsbury Rams players
Sheffield Eagles players